Anisomastia is a medical condition in which there is a severe asymmetry or unequalness in the size of the breasts, generally related to a difference in volume. In other words, when one of the breasts is much larger than the other. In contrast to anisomastia, a slight  asymmetry of the breasts is common. Anisomastia may be corrected by surgical breast augmentation or reduction.

See also
 Micromastia
 Breast hypertrophy

References

External links 

Breast diseases
Medical terminology